Lin Hsin-i (born 2 December 1946) is a Taiwanese businessman. He served in the Democratic Progressive Party administration as Minister of Economic Affairs between 2000 and 2002, then as Vice Premier between 2002 and 2004.

In November 2005, while a Senior Presidential Adviser, Lin attended the Asia Pacific Economic Cooperation (APEC) forum in Busan, South Korea, in place of Taiwan's President Chen Shui-bian. Because of opposition from the People's Republic of China, Taiwan's senior leaders are unable to attend APEC events in person and must send a ministerial-level envoy. He was Chairman of the Industrial Technology Research Institute from 2004 to 2008.

A graduate of National Cheng Kung University, Lin was an executive in the car industry before entering politics.

See also
 List of vice premiers of the Republic of China

References

Politicians of the Republic of China on Taiwan from Tainan
National Cheng Kung University alumni
Taiwanese businesspeople
Living people
Taiwanese Ministers of Economic Affairs
1946 births
Oklahoma City University alumni
Recipients of the Order of Brilliant Star